Lucio Marineo Siculo (Vizzini, 1444 or 1445 – Spain, 1533) was a Sicilian humanist, historian and poet, known as a prominent figure of the Spanish Renaissance.

He first taught Greek and Latin literature in Palermo. He moved to Spain and taught for twelve years at the University of Salamanca. His teaching and books influenced the development of the Spanish Renaissance, and his disciples included Alfono de Segura. King Ferdinand brought him to the royal court to serve as chaplain and chronicler. He was also charged with the education of the children of the nobility.

Works 

 De laudibus Hispaniae Libri VII (Burgos, 1496) 
 De rebus Hispaniae memorabilibus Libri XXV (Alcalá, 1530)
 De Aragoniae Regibus et eorum rebus gestis libri V (Zaragoza, 1509)
 Epistolarum familiarum libri XVII

References 
 MARINEO, Luca, detto Lucio Marineo Siculo, Dizionario biografico degli italiani.

1444 births
1533 deaths
People from Vizzini
15th-century Italian historians
Academic staff of the University of Salamanca
Writers from Sicily
Italian Renaissance humanists
Italian expatriates in Spain
16th-century Italian historians